Michael Blackson is a Ghanaian-Liberian actor, philanthropist, and comedian based in the United States.

Early life 
Michael Blackson was born to a Ghanaian father and a Ghanaian mother. He spent his young years in between Monrovia and Ghana before relocating to the United States in the mid-1980s. His father died in 2008. Michael lived in  Newark, New Jersey when he was 13, and then settled in Philadelphia, Pennsylvania when he was 15. He began pursuing comedy after his coworker at Domino's suggested he start open mic.

Career 
In 2005, he released a comedy sketch CD entitled Modasucka: Welcome to America. Also in 2005, he made an appearance on TV series 30 Rock, P. Diddy Presents: The Bad Boys of Comedy on HBO, and starred in a commercial for Chappelle's Show on Comedy Central.

In 2011, Blackson appeared on Starz's Martin Lawrence Presents: 1st Amendment Stand-up and Showtime's Shaquille O'Neal Presents All Star Comedy Jam.

In 2019, Blackson appeared in the "Wakonda" official music video by Akon.

Personal life 
On July 31, 2021, Blackson proposed to his girlfriend, Rada Darling, during a radio interview on The Breakfast Club, they continue to be together as partners. On November 24, 2021, he became a U.S citizen. Blackson is the uncle of Cincinnati Bengals cornerback Eli Apple. As part of his work in philanthropy he built a school in Ghana that was commissioned in early January 2023. The school which is eponymously named Michael Blackson Academy, is located at Agona Nsaba in the Agona East District of Ghana’s Central Region where he grew up.

Filmography

Film

Television

References

External links 
 

1972 births
Living people
Male actors from Philadelphia
Comedians from Pennsylvania
Liberian male film actors
Liberian male comedians
American male film actors
American male comedians
Ghanaian comedians
20th-century American male actors
20th-century American comedians
21st-century American male actors
21st-century American comedians
American male television actors
Liberian emigrants to the United States
Liberian people of Ghanaian descent
American people of Liberian descent
American people of Ghanaian descent